Milan Stojanović may refer to:

 Milan Stojanović (goalkeeper) (active in 1930), Yugoslavian football goalkeeper
 Milan Stojanović (midfielder) (born 1988), Serbian football midfielder